Husmandstøsen is a 1952 Danish family film directed by Alice O'Fredericks. It is based on the 1908 novella The Girl from the Marsh Croft by Selma Lagerlöf.

Plot
In the windswept heathland around 1900, the poor Helga leaves her home to work on a farm. Here she is seduced by the gentleman and pregnant with his child. He refuses to acknowledge paternity, and expelled from the local community, Helga now has to fight alone to stay alive. In times of need, she gets a place at Torpegård, where Gudmund lives with his old mother. His fiancé, however, is anything but enthusiastic about Helga's presence.

Cast
 Grethe Thordahl as Helga
 Ib Schønberg as Sorte Niels
 Maria Garland as Helgas mor Birthe
 Jakob Nielsen as Helgas far Karl
 Johannes Meyer as Søren Torpegaard
 Helga Frier as Ingeborg Torpegaard
 Poul Reichhardt as Gudmund Torpegaard
 Sigurd Langberg as Lars Storgaard
 Ebba Thoman as Maria Storgaard
 Nina Pens Rode as Hildur Storgaard
 Ernst Bruun Olsen as Johan Storgaard
 Jørn Jeppesen as Per Mortensen
 Signi Grenness as Jensine Mortensen
 Svend Methling as Herredsfogeden
 Einar Juhl as Herredsfogedens fuldmægtig
 Lily Broberg as Marie
 Else Jarlbak as Karen
 Carl Heger as Politibetjent
 Henry Jessen as En gårdskarl
 Niels Moltzen as En gårdskarl

References

External links
 

1952 films
Danish black-and-white films
1950s Danish-language films
Films based on works by Selma Lagerlöf
Films directed by Alice O'Fredericks
Films scored by Sven Gyldmark
Danish drama films
1952 drama films